Paul Joan George (Jos) Kapteyn (born 31 January 1928 in Laren) is a Dutch judge. He has been a member of the Council of State of the Netherlands and has been a judge at the European Court of Justice.

Biography
Kapteyn was born in Laren in 1928 as the son of M.J.P Schröder and Paul Kapteyn. His father would later become a Labour Party politician in the Dutch Senate and in the predecessors of the European Parliament.
In 1950 Kapteyn earned a Master of Laws and in 1960 a Doctor of Law degree at the Leiden University. His dissertation was about the Common Assembly of the European Coal and Steel Community between 1952 and 1958, his father served in that institution during that period. He then pursued a career as an official in the Dutch Ministry of Foreign Affairs, serving between 1960 and 1963. He worked as a professor of Law of International Organisations at Utrecht University between 1963 and 1975, and then continued in the same position at Leiden University. He only worked shortly at Leiden University as he was appointed member of the Council of State of the Netherlands in November 1976. In 1980 Kapteyn was made member of the Royal Netherlands Academy of Arts and Sciences. In 1990 Kapteyn moved to European law and until 2000 he served as a judge in the European Court of Justice. He succeeded Thijmen Koopmans as the Dutch judge, he himself was succeeded by Christiaan Timmermans. After his return to the Netherlands he served as professor of European Studies (Ynso Scholten professorship) at the University of Amsterdam between 2000 and 2005.

Memberships
 Member of the American Society of International Law
 Member of the Administrative Council of the Hague Academy of International Law
 Member of the International Commission of Jurists
 Member of the Netherlands Association of International Law
 Member of the Royal Netherlands Academy of Arts and Sciences

References

1928 births
Living people
People from Laren, North Holland
20th-century Dutch judges
Dutch legal scholars
Leiden University alumni
Academic staff of Leiden University
Academic staff of Utrecht University
Academic staff of the University of Amsterdam
Members of the Royal Netherlands Academy of Arts and Sciences
Members of the Council of State (Netherlands)
European Court of Justice judges
Dutch judges of international courts and tribunals